Rose Cottage/Peyton House is a historic home located at Charlottesville, Virginia. It was built in 1856, as a simple three-bay, single-pile, two-story rectangular frame dwelling.  The house is sheathed in weatherboard. Later 20th century additions include a single story Colonial Revival porch; matching one-story, one room wings; and a two-story, perpendicular house joined by and enclosed porch.

It was listed on the National Register of Historic Places in 1983, and was removed from the National Register in 2017.

References

Houses on the National Register of Historic Places in Virginia
Houses completed in 1856
Houses in Charlottesville, Virginia
National Register of Historic Places in Charlottesville, Virginia
Former National Register of Historic Places in Virginia